"" is a French popular song composed in 1947 by Henri Betti with the lyrics by André Hornez. The English lyrics were written in 1949 by Jerry Seelen. The song has been adapted in several languages.

History 
In July 1947, Henri Betti was in Nice and on his way to join his father in the center of town to play a game of bridge. Passing under the arcades of the  he stopped in front of the window of a  lingerie shop and it was there that the first nine musical notes of the song came into his head: F, E, E, F, G, A, G, F, D. He wrote the notes on a sheet of music paper so that he would remember them. Once back home at 52 , he composed the melody in less than ten minutes. He then went up to Paris and made an appointment with the lyricist André Hornez at the Hôtel Grand Powers at 52  to find a title for his song. André Hornez said that the title should be three syllables, sung to the first three notes of the song. Henri Betti told him that that was the one he wanted but André Hornez pointed out that there had been a song by Charles Trenet written for the movie Frederica named "" a few years previously. Henri Betti told him that  made all the difference. The song was registered at the SACEM on 18 August 1947.

On the advice of Roger Seiller at SACEM's publisher, Paul Beuscher, he proposed the song to Yves Montand at the same time as "" which he had composed with lyrics from Édith Piaf and deposited at SACEM the same day. While waiting for the song editor to offer him another performer, Henri Betti sang it himself at the restaurant  in Nice in the evening with opening and closing music. In January 1948, the publisher Paul Beuscher told Henri Betti that he would first try out the song with Jacques Hélian and his Orchestra for the radio. The disc was recorded the following month and sung by Jean Marco.

In February 1948 the publisher offered the song to Suzy Delair to sing during the first Nice Jazz Festival. She sang the song on February 28 at the Hotel Negresco in a jam session called  at which Louis Armstrong was present; he loved the song. On June 26, 1950, Armstrong recorded the American version of the song with Sy Oliver and his Orchestra in New York City. When the disc was released, it was a worldwide success and the song was subsequently taken up by many great international singers.

Recordings 

On 18 January 1948, Jean Marco performed the song with Jacques Hélian and his Orchestra for the radio station  of the French Broadcasting.

On 26 February 1948, Lucien Jeunesse recorded the song with Émile Prud'homme and his Orchestra.

On 5 May 1948, the Étienne Sisters recorded the song with Raymond Legrand and his Orchestra and this version became a hit. In 1968, they recorded it again with Raymond Legrand and his Orchestra.

On 7 May 1948, Yves Montand recorded the song with Bob Castella and his Orchestra. In 1964, he recorded the song again but with Hubert Rostaing and his Orchestra for his album 

The same year, Bernard Hilda recorded the song with his orchestra. On the other side of the disk, he records another song composed by Henri Betti the same year: "" (lyrics by Édith Piaf).

On 30 March 1950, Jean Sablon recorded the French version of the song in London with Woolf Phillips and his Orchestra. On 23 November of the same year, he recorded the English version in Buenos Aires with Emil Stern and his Orchestra.

From 18 March to 9 December 1950, Sylvie St. Clair sang the English version of the song with Debroy Somers and his Orchestra in the revue Latin Quarter 1950 created by Robert Nesbitt and presented at the London Casino.

In 1951, Dolores Gray sang the song in English in the short film Holiday in Paris: Paris.

In 1953, Eartha Kitt recorded the song in French with Henri René and his Orchestra for her album That Bad Eartha.  A year later, she sang the song in New Faces.

In 1953, Stan Freberg sang a comic version of the song.

In 1954, Eddie Constantine recorded the song in French with Herman Garst and his Orchestra.

In 1957, Nat King Cole sang the song in English with Nelson Riddle and his Orchestra in The Nat King Cole Show.

In 1958, Caterina Valente recorded the song in English with Kurt Edelhagen and his Orchestra for her album A Toast to the Girls.

In 1960, Conway Twitty recorded the song in English, adding "It's So Good" to the title. It was a non-album single release.

In 1961, Bing Crosby recorded the song in English with musical arrangements by Bob Thompson and conducted by Malcolm Lockyer for his album Holiday in Europe, a collection of European hits.

In 1962, Dean Martin recorded the song in English with the musical arrangements of Neal Hefti for his album French Style where he sings several popular French songs.

In 1964, Jane Morgan covered the song on her album The Last Time I Saw Paris with both French and English lyrics.

Also in 1964, Allan Sherman recorded a parody, "I See Bones" for his album My Son, the Nut, with a doctor describing to his patient an X-ray showing various improbable items in his innards.

In 1966, Barbra Streisand recorded the song in English with the musical arrangements of Michel Legrand (son of Raymond Legrand) for her album Color Me Barbra which is promoted in a color TV show on CBS on 30 March 1966.

In 1978 Yukihiro Takahashi recorded a bilingual version of the song in Japanese and French for his album Saravah!

In 1978, Madleen Kane and Rhoda Scott recorded a bilingual disco version of the song.

In 1979, Dream Express recorded a disco version of the song in English.

In 1992, Take 6 recorded a bilingual a cappella version of the song for an advertisement on a toilet water by Yves Saint Laurent.

In 1993, Abbey Lincoln recorded the song in French accompanied by Hank Jones on piano for her album When There Is Love.

In 2003, Lisa Ono recorded a Bossa nova version of the song in French with the musical arrangements of Mario Adnet for her album  where she sings several popular French songs.

In 2006, Arielle Dombasle recorded the song in a bilingual version with the musical arrangements of Jean-Pascal Beintus for her album .

In 2016, Tatiana Eva-Marie recorded the song in French with the Avalon Jazz Band on their album "Je suis Swing", a tribute to the Zazous.

In 2017, Mireille Mathieu recorded the song (in French) for her double CD album Made in France, which gathers the greatest French songs known around the world, interpreted by the singer. It was announced in her official website on 15 August that year.

In 2020, Thomas Dutronc recorded the song in trio with Iggy Pop and Diana Krall for his album Frenchy where he covers several popular French songs.

In 2022, Nikki Yanofsky recorded the song in Frech and released it as a single and is on her album Nikki by Starlight.

Adaptations 
In 1949, Giacomo Mario Gili and Nino Rastelli wrote the Italian lyrics of the song for the recording of Natalino Otto with Luciano Zuccheri and his Orchestra in March 1949. The title of the song became "".

The same year, Jerry Seelen wrote the English lyrics for the recording of Johnny Desmond with Tony Mottola and his Orchestra in January 1950. The title of the song is not translated. In 1963, Allan Sherman wrote other English lyrics for his version, which he named "I See Bones".

In 1950, Ralph Maria Siegel wrote the German lyrics for the recording of Rita Gallos with Kurt Edelhagen and his Orchestra in May 1950. In 1983, Adrian Wolf wrote other German lyrics with the pseudonym Thore Holgerson for Maren Kroymann's version. The title of the song is not translated into German.

The same year, Tapio Kullervo Lahtinen wrote the Finnish lyrics for the recording of Maire Ojonen with George de Godzinsky and his Orchestra. The title of the song became "".

The same year, Gösta Rybrant wrote the Swedish lyrics for the recording of Gustaf Torrestad with Thore Jederby and his Orchestra. The title of the song is not translated. In 1980, Gösta Wälivaara wrote other Swedish lyrics for the recording of Janne Carlsson and the title of his version became "". In 1995, Claes Eriksson wrote other Swedish lyrics for the recording of Galenskaparna och After Shave with Den ofattbara and his Orchestra and the title of his version became "".

In 1952, Henryk Rostworowski wrote the Polish lyrics for the recording of Marta Mirska with Wiesław Machan and his Orchestra. In 2000, Wojciech Młynarski wrote other Polish lyrics for the recording of Irena Santor. The title of the song is not translated into Polish.

The title of the song is not translated into Danish.

Gustavo Dasca wrote the Spanish lyrics for the recording of Ana María González. The title of the song became "".

Vécsey Ernő wrote the Hungarian lyrics for the recording of Záray Márta. The title of the song became "".

In 1974, Klaane Jan wrote the Dutch lyrics for his version with Roland Thyssen and his Orchestra. The title of the song became "".

In 1978, Jun'ichi Nakahara wrote the Japanese lyrics for the recording of Yukihiro Takahashi. The title of the song is not translated into Japanese.

In 1984, Alla Bayanova wrote the Romanian lyrics for his version. The title of the song became "".

In 1988, Roberto de Carvalho wrote the Portuguese lyrics for the recording of Rita Lee. The title of the song become "Cecy Bom". In 2016, Izabella Rocha wrote other Portuguese lyrics for her version, which she named "".

Filmography

Advertisements

References

1947 songs
French songs
1940s jazz standards
Songs with music by Henri Betti
Yves Montand songs
Louis Armstrong songs
Eartha Kitt songs
Dean Martin songs
Barbra Streisand songs
Tino Rossi songs
Amanda Lear songs
Petula Clark songs
Dionne Warwick songs
Caterina Valente songs
Jazz songs